Papustyla is a genus of air-breathing land snails, terrestrial pulmonate gastropod mollusks in the subfamily Hadrinae of the family Camaenidae.

Species 
This genus contains the following species:
 Papustyla chancei (Cox, 1870) Chance's Papustyla.
 Papustyla chapmani (Cox 1870), Chapman's Papustyla.
 Papustyla fergusoni  (H. Adams, 1872) Ferguson's Papustyla.
 Papustyla hindei (Cox, 1886)
 Papustyla lilium (Fulton, 1905) Lily-white Papustyla.
 Papustyla novaepommeraniae  (I. Rensch & B. Rensch, 1929) New Pommeran Papustyla.
 Papustyla pulcherrima  (I. Rensch, 1931) Emerald green snail.
 Papustyla xanthochila  (Pfeiffer, 1861) Golden mouth Papustyla.
Species brought into synonymy
 Papustyla horderi (G. B. Sowerby III, 1890): synonym of Papuina antiqua horderi (G. B. Sowerby III, 1890)(superseded combination)

References

 Bank, R. A. (2017). Classification of the Recent terrestrial Gastropoda of the World. Last update: July 16th, 2017

External links
 Iredale, T. (1941). A basic list of the land Mollusca of Papua. The Australian Zoologist. 10(1): 51-94, pls. 3-4
 Clench, W. J.; Turner, R. D. (1963 ["1962"). Monographs of the Genera Papustyla, Forcartia and Meliobba (Papuininae: Camaenidae). Journal of the Malacological Society of Australia. 1(6): 3-33]

Camaenidae